Zarivar Rural District is a rural district (dehestan) in the Central District of Marivan County, Kurdistan Province, Iran. At the 2006 census, its population was 9,381, in 2,045 families. The rural district has 13 villages.

References 

Rural Districts of Kurdistan Province
Marivan County